In enzymology, an alkylhalidase is an enzyme that catalyzes the chemical reaction

bromochloromethane + H2O  formaldehyde + bromide + chloride

Thus, the two substrates of this enzyme are bromochloromethane and H2O, whereas its 3 products are formaldehyde, bromide, and chloride.

This enzyme belongs to the family of hydrolases, specifically those acting on halide bonds in carbon-halide compounds.  The systematic name of this enzyme class is alkyl-halide halidohydrolase. Other names in common use include halogenase, haloalkane halidohydrolase, and haloalkane dehalogenase.

References

Further reading 
 

EC 3.8.1
Enzymes of unknown structure